Gaele Sobott (born 1956), also known as Gaele Sobott-Mogwe, is an Australian author of poetry, short stories, non-fiction and children's books.

Life
Gaele was born in Yallourn, Victoria, 1956. She lived in Botswana as a citizen for a large part of her life. She did her undergraduate degree, majoring in English and History, at the University of Botswana and taught in the English Department there.  She spent time studying in France, and England where she completed a PhD on South African women writers at the University of Hull. She currently lives in Sydney, Australia.

She is the founding director of Outlandish Arts; a disabled-led, arts organisation.

Career

Gaele Sobott wrote the literary biography My Longest Round: the life story of Wally Carr, published by Magabala Books.  Wally' Wait-a-While' Carr was an Australian, First Nations, ex-champion boxer who held twelve titles in six divisions. From featherweight to heavyweight, one of the last of the fifteen-rounders, he fought an astonishing 101 professional bouts in his 15-year boxing career. My Longest Round provides a Wiradjuri man's perspective on inner-city Sydney; the two-up games, the gangsters, and the way working-class neighbourhoods looked out for each other. From hunting goannas, Jimmy Sharman's boxing tents, rugby league, professional boxing and the first Aboriginal Tent Embassy to present-day struggles and lifestyles, this story offers a vital snapshot of Aboriginal and Australian history. Gaele worked closely with Wally to render a vivid account of his life.

She is also editor of Young Days: Bankstown Aboriginal Elders Oral History Project, published in 2013.

Her collection of short stories, Colour Me Blue, is published by Heinemann African Writers Series. It blends fantasy and reality, melding African history and tradition with the grittiness of everyday life. The stories capture the casual or determined oppression of men and women, the tenderness of human affection and the powerful rhythm of African myth. The politics of personal relationships are explored against a background of social injustice and material hardship. Sobott's writing is characterised by a 'mixture of traditional storytelling and modern day-to-day struggles'.

Her short stories and poems appear in various literary magazines and anthologies, such as the Anchor Book of Modern African Stories,  Botswana Women Write and Not Quite Right For Us. Gaele's animated poems have won numerous international awards.

Her children's fiction includes The Magic Pool, where some children decide to go and find out if the stories about the python at the waterhole are true. Tickles is about Moabi and Sonti, who help on a game reserve when the rangers bring in an orphaned baby elephant. Weird Wambo lives alone in a baobab tree. The village's children laugh at her until they need her help one day, and Thara Meets the Cassipoohka Man addresses global warming. It received the Zimbabwe Award for Children's Literature.

Her essay, "Commutare", about commuting from Sydney's western suburbs to the Central Business District, appears in Sydney Review of Books.  Gaele has also written on gender relations in Botswana during the Second World War and how the British government sought to increase food production in the then Bechuanaland Protectorate for export purposes. With so many Batswana men away in the army and the South African mines, this required the intensified use of women's labour. In another essay entitled "Humans Being", she points to the importance of viewing the "being" in human beings as a verb. Being means, we may close down and open up human relating, human communicating, human solidarity...writing and sharing stories is an integral part of this being'.

References

External links

Author's website
Commutare, Sydney Review of Books
AstroTurf, Cordite Poetry Review
Invasion Species, Plumwood Mountain
Indie Shorts Awards interview with Gaele Sobott
Disability Arts Online, Gaele Sobott Poetry Showcase 
The Cry Room, Verity La
My Longest Round: the life story of Wally Carr - Gaele Sobott on process and life writing in Wasafiri
Focus on Australian Women Writers with Disability, Gaele Sobott
Writing NSW interview with Gaele Sobott, Emerging Writers Festival Roadshow
Interview with Accessible Arts
Bibliography Bechuanaland Second World War

1956 births
Living people
Australian children's writers
Australian women children's writers
Academic staff of the University of Botswana
People from Yallourn